The 2016 1. deild kvinnur was the 32nd season of women's league football in the Faroe Islands.

The league was won by KÍ, its 17th consecutive title and 18th overall. By winning, KÍ qualified to 2017–18 UEFA Women's Champions League.

League table

Top scorers

References

1. deild kvinnur seasons
Faroe Islands
women
women